is a 2015 magical girl anime series produced by Studio DEEN and TMS Entertainment. It is the 7th and final installment in the Jewelpet anime franchise based on the characters jointly created by Sanrio and Sega Sammy Holdings. It is directed by Nobuhiro Kondo (Nobunagun) and written by Masahiro Yokotani (Free!, Beelzebub). Character designs are done by Hiroki Harada (Romeo × Juliet) and Tomoko Miyakawa. It aired in all TXN stations in Japan on April 4, 2015 to December 26, 2015, replacing Lady Jewelpet in its initial time slot.

Jewelpet: Magical Change reintroduced the magical girl genre after 5 years, since Jewelpet Twinkle in 2010. The anthropomorphisation of the Jewelpet serve as a plot device for this series. A rerun show titled  aired on the same time slot on TV Tokyo on January 9, 2016.

Story
7 years ago, a strange castle fell from the sky into a normal suburban town without warning. Confusion has arisen about where this castle came from, and the town's citizens have come in to investigate, only to fail due to being locked. Now known as the Jewel Castle, no one has been paying attention to it ever since its sudden arrival on Earth. In fact, people have never known the castle is of other worldly origin, as Jewel Land's magic fades, the castle appears in the human world due to mankind's fading belief in magic. In order to strengthen its magic once more, Jewelpets are sent all across the Human World in order to study their way of life and in hopes that their helping hand could rekindle their "magic-believing hearts".

One of the Jewelpets sent to Earth is Ruby; a cheerful Japanese hare who ends up with Airi Kirara, a young girl who befriends her at a young age. Years later, Airi, now at the age of 14, is still remembering that meeting and now wearing a pendant that her father gave her. She then met up with other Jewelpets: Luna, Larima and Labra, who came to her world from Jewel Land searching for Ruby. As they found her and got into trouble, Ruby discover a new ability; merging with Airi's pendant to change into a human being to cast magic. Now, the Jewelpets must try to get adjusted to the new world while they try to discover the mysteries behind Airi's pendant and its relation to the incident 7 years ago.

Characters

Main characters
 
 Voiced by: Ari Ozawa
The series' main protagonist, Airi is a 14-year-old junior-high student living in a town where the Jewel Castle has fallen to. 7 years ago, she once encountered a Jewelpet named Ruby and asked her to do magic for her, but Ruby's mishaps caused her to get hit by a Sleep-Listening set, causing her to faint out. 7 years later, she then met the other Jewelpets who are searching for Ruby and reunited. Now she is currently living with 4 of them alongside her big brother. Though she is nice and kind-hearted, she is also very deductive and has detective skills that she learned from her father being a Private Detective. She is also good on doing chores around the house such as cooking, washing and cleaning. Airi also use the Magical Stone in certain situations, that allows to change her Jewelpet friends into their human forms. She was prophesied to be the Savior of Jewel Land, due to her relation with the Magical Stone, but however, what role she will take part on is a mystery.

Voiced by: Kōtarō Nishiyama
Sakutaro is Airi's 17-year older brother who attends 2nd Year High School. Very analytical and ambitious, he usually invents things for the household and believes that there's nothing that can't be solved by science. He also refuses to accept any Jewelpet's help due to their magic and more on focusing on inventing things, however, he soon accepted them as part of the family. Though wearing glasses, he has green eyes under those and Laura has a crush on him. He also starting to have feelings for Luna also.

Voiced by: Rui Tanabe
14 years old and also Airi's childhood friend from France, she is the heir of the Fukuouji Zaibatsu. She returned to Japan to see her again and usually has a strange relationship with Luea, both aiming to get Airi's Magical Stone and make sure Laura got close to Sakutaro.

Supporting characters

Voiced by: Eriko Matsui
Laura's servant.

Voiced by: Amina Satō
One of Airi's close human friends, she is a girl who has freckles on her face and wears glasses.

Voiced by: Sumire Morohoshi
Appearing in Episode 9, she is a College Student who became friends with King after he appeared in the Human World

Voiced by: Haruka Yoshimura
Appearing in Episode 11, she's a female Kappa who Airi and her friends met in the forest.

Voiced by: Tetsu Inada
The owner of the restaurant "Denden Sushi", in where Peridot works during her stay in the human world.

Voiced by: Kaijin-san-tachi
A group of Watermelon-themed soldiers that Sapphie created in a deserted island by modifying plants. They are usually weak and reverts to watermelons when got beaten.

Development
Jewelpet: Magical Change was first revealed during the 2015 Winter Wonder Festival in Japan and was confirmed in the March Issue of the Shogakukan magazine Pucchigumi. The April Issue also confirmed the show's new concept, revolving around the Jewelpets transforming into Human (Moe anthropomorphism) through magical means, thought It is still unconfirmed about how the transformation will be done. The series will also use original concepts from the franchise's earlier years.

On March 16, the 4-piece idol group Dorothy Little Happy confirmed that they will perform the ending theme song to coincide with their 5th Anniversary tour in Japan. A 30-second promotional video has been streamed through the YouTube account of fellow Sega Sammy subsidiary TMS Entertainment with permission from Sanrio and Studio DEEN A special live event was held on April 3, 2015 on Sanrio Puroland in conjunction with the new series' launch. The main voice actors and the group Dorothy Little Happy appeared in the event as fans viewed the first episode. Ayaka Saito, the voice actor of Ruby stated in her blog that the series will run for 39 episodes.

Media

Anime
Jewelpet: Magical Change premiered on April 4, 2015 and ended on December 26, 2015 in all TXN stations, including TV Tokyo and TV Osaka at 9:30 a.m on Saturdays, replacing Lady Jewelpet in its initial time slot. Victor Entertainment released the series in 3 DVD-Box sets in Japan, with the first box set released on October 23, 2015.

Music
The opening song is titled  by Magical☆Dreamin. The first ending song is titled Tell me tell me!! by Dorothy Little Happy, the second is titled Baby, Love me! by GEM and the third titled  by X21.

Unit Member

GEM
Nana Minamiguchi
Lana Murakami

X21
Mami Nagao

Controversy
A minor controversy sparked in the series's voice casting, which enraged the fans. During the press conference of the anime, Misono stated that she got Luna's role through a fair audition and was happy to be part of the cast, despite her announcing her retirement in the media business. However long time cast member Ayaka Saito said on her blog that she is saddened about the absence of Garnet and Sapphie and their voice actors Aya Hirano and Nozomi Sasaki, saying it was a "sad farewell due to behind the scenes circumstances". Luna's original voice actor, Rumi Shishido was shocked also and said in her tweet that she was not informed there was even an audition to replace her, or even the fact that she had been replaced. She told people to stop talking about the incident and to clear her name.

On April 14, 2015, Misono updated her blog and made a public apology to Rumi, saying that "I said [I got the role] due to 'talent' and 'my own strength,' but I was wrong... It's 'thanks to the staff...' I'm so sorry." She also said that she was so happy about her debut that she could only think about herself, and that she never wanted to make it into a situation in which she "stole" someone else's role or work. She also said that she received a lot of death threats from fans, However, she noted that she wants to hear the opinions, advice, and feelings about her acting during the show from parents, and assured viewers that she would not ignore their voices.

References

External links
 Official Website
 

2015 anime television series debuts
Jewelpet
Japanese children's animated comedy television series
Japanese children's animated fantasy television series
Magical girl anime and manga
Moe anthropomorphism
Studio Deen
TMS Entertainment
TV Tokyo original programming